The Mahdi is a 1981 thriller novel by Philip Nicholson, writing as A. J. Quinnell. The book was published in 1981 by Macmillan in the UK then in January 1982 by William Morrow & Co in the US and deals with political power struggles over a presumed Muslim prophet.

Synopsis
The Mahdi follows several characters as they attempt to find a way to negate the threat of Muslim fundamentalism to the Western World's oil supply. Pritchard, a slick triple agent, has been tapped to help solve the problem. He proposes that they find the Mahdi, a prophet that has been prophesied to follow Muhammad, and attempt to control him, as control over the Mahdi would give them control over the Muslim world.

Reception
Reception to The Mahdi was mixed, with many reviewers criticizing the book's implausibility. The New York Times gave The Mahdi an overall positive review, calling the plot "elegant" while stating that the lack of a defined villain makes it seem as if there were "less at stake here than there ought to be".

References

American thriller novels
Macmillan Publishers books
1981 American novels